Patton Township is located in Ford County, Illinois. As of the 2010 census, its population was 5,358 and it contained 2,304 housing units. It was named Prairie City Township when established as a township in Vermilion County; its name was changed to Patton Township on September 14, 1857.

Geography

Paxton
Paxton, the county seat, is the largest town in Patton Township.

Perdueville
Perdueville is an unincorporated area in section 9 of Patton township. Extant structures include a grain elevator which is still in service next to the rail grade, now removed. The Perdueville Pheasant Habitat Area is located in section 32 of the township.

Ten Mile Grove
Ten Mile Grove is said to be the earliest settlement in Patton Township with about a dozen families residing there in 1853. It was located on the Danville-Ottawa road and named such because it was ten miles (16 km) from the nearest settlement. The grove is partly contained in the Howard Thomas Memorial Nature Preserve. The preserve, containing many Bur oak, sustained damage in a 2004 wind storm which felled numerous trees. Thirty to fifty percent of trees were felled in some portions, especially the western part. Volunteers cleared trees from the trails, one of which had 17 trees blocking it.

Cemeteries
The township contains these seven cemeteries: Farmersville, Glen, Hall, Meharry, Pells Park, Prospect and Ten Mile Grove.

Major highways
  Interstate 57
  US Route 45
  Illinois Route 9

Airports and landing strips
 C D Maulding Airport
 Clifford D Foster Airport
 Paxton Airport

Demographics

School districts
 Paxton-Buckley-Loda Community Unit School District 10

Political districts
 Illinois' 15th congressional district
 State House District 105
 State Senate District 53

References
 
 United States Census Bureau 2007 TIGER/Line Shapefiles
 United States National Atlas

External links 
City-data.com
Illinois State Archives

Townships in Ford County, Illinois
Townships in Illinois